Gloria Cecilia Ramirez (January 11, 1963 – February 19, 1994) was a woman from Riverside, California, who was dubbed "the Toxic Lady" or "the Toxic Woman" by the media when several hospital workers became ill after exposure to her body and blood. She had been admitted to the emergency department while suffering from late-stage cervical cancer. While treating Ramirez, several hospital workers fainted and others experienced symptoms such as shortness of breath and muscle spasms. Five workers required hospitalization, one of whom remained in an intensive care unit for two weeks.

Shortly after arriving at the hospital, Ramirez died from complications related to cancer. The incident was initially considered to be a case of mass hysteria. An investigation by Lawrence Livermore National Laboratory proposed that Ramirez had been self-administering dimethyl sulfoxide as a treatment for pain, which converted into dimethyl sulfate, an extremely poisonous and highly carcinogenic alkylating agent, via a series of chemical reactions in the emergency department. This theory has been endorsed by the Riverside Coroner's Office and published in the journal Forensic Science International.

Emergency department visit
About 8:15 p.m. on the evening of February 19, 1994, Ramirez, suffering from severe heart palpitations, was brought into the emergency department of Riverside General Hospital in Riverside, by paramedics. She was extremely confused and was suffering from tachycardia and Cheyne–Stokes respiration.

The medical staff injected her with diazepam, midazolam, and lorazepam to sedate her. When it became clear that Ramirez was responding poorly to treatment, the staff tried to defibrillate her heart; at that point several people saw an oily sheen covering Ramirez's body, and some noticed a fruity, garlic-like odor that they thought was coming from her mouth. Registered nurse Susan Kane drew blood from Ramirez's arm and noticed an ammonia-like smell coming from the tube.

She passed the tube to Julie Gorchynski, a medical resident, who noticed manila-colored particles floating in the blood. At this point, Kane fainted and was removed from the room. Shortly thereafter, Gorchynski began to feel nauseated. Complaining that she was lightheaded, she left the trauma room and sat at a nurse's desk. A staff member asked her if she was okay, but before she could respond she also fainted. Maureen Welch, a respiratory therapist who was assisting in the trauma room, was the third to pass out. The staff was then ordered to evacuate all emergency department patients to the parking lot outside the hospital. Overall, 23 people became ill and five were hospitalized. A skeleton crew stayed behind to stabilize Ramirez. At 8:50 p.m., after 45 minutes of CPR and defibrillation, Ramirez was pronounced dead from kidney failure related to her cancer.

Investigation
The county health department called in California's Department of Health and Human Services, which put two scientists, Drs. Ana Maria Osorio and Kirsten Waller, on the case. They interviewed 34 hospital staff who had been working in the emergency department on February 19. Using a standardized questionnaire, Osorio and Waller found that the people who had developed severe symptoms, such as loss of consciousness, shortness of breath, and muscle spasms, tended to have certain things in common. People who had worked within two feet of Ramirez and had handled her intravenous lines had been at high risk. But other factors that correlated with severe symptoms did not appear to match a scenario in which fumes had been released: the survey found that those afflicted tended to be women rather than men, and they all had normal blood tests after the exposure. They believed the hospital workers suffered from mass hysteria.

Gorchynski denied that she had been affected by mass hysteria and pointed to her own medical history as evidence. After the exposure, she spent two weeks in the intensive care unit with breathing problems. She developed hepatitis and avascular necrosis in her knees. Riverside Coroner's Office contacted Lawrence Livermore National Laboratory to investigate the incident. Livermore Labs postulated that Ramirez had been using dimethyl sulfoxide (DMSO), a solvent used as a powerful degreaser, as a home remedy for pain. Users of this substance report that it has a garlic-like taste. Sold in gel form at hardware stores, it could also explain the greasy appearance of Ramirez's body. The Livermore scientists theorized that the DMSO in Ramirez's system might have built up owing to urinary blockage caused by her kidney failure. Oxygen administered by the paramedics would have combined with the DMSO to form dimethyl sulfone (DMSO2). DMSO2 is known to crystallize at room temperature, and crystals were observed in some of Ramirez's drawn blood. Electric shocks administered during emergency defibrillation could have then converted the DMSO2 into dimethyl sulfate (DMSO4), the highly toxic dimethyl ester of sulfuric acid, exposure to which could have caused some of the reported symptoms of the emergency department staff. The Livermore scientists postulated on The New Detectives that the change in temperature of the blood drawn, from the 98.6 °F (37 °C) of Ramirez's body to the 64 °F (18 °C) of the emergency department, may have contributed to its conversion from DMSO2 into DMSO4. This, however, has not been confirmed.

Burial 
Two months after Ramirez died, her severely decomposed body was released for an independent autopsy and burial. The Riverside Coroner's Office hailed Livermore's DMSO conclusion as the probable cause of the hospital workers' symptoms, while her family disagreed. The Ramirez family's pathologist was unable to determine a cause of death because her heart was missing, her other organs were cross-contaminated with fecal matter, and her body was too decomposed. On April 20, 1994—ten weeks after her death—Ramirez was buried at Olivewood Memorial Park in Riverside.

Status of technical forensic analysis
The possible chemical explanation for this incident by Patrick M. Grant of the Livermore Forensic Science Center is beginning to appear in basic forensic science textbooks. In Houck and Siegel's textbook, the authors state that, although some weaknesses exist, the postulated scenario is "the most scientific explanation to date" and that "beyond this theory, no credible explanation has ever been offered for the strange case of Gloria Ramirez."

Grant's conclusions and speculations about the incident were evaluated by professional forensic scientists, chemists, and toxicologists, passed peer review in an accredited, refereed journal, and were published by Forensic Science International. The first paper was technically detailed and contained two potential chemical reaction mechanisms that may possibly have formed dimethyl sulfate from dimethyl sulfoxide and dimethyl sulfone precursors. The second communication gave supplemental support for the postulated chemical scenario as well as insight into some of the sociology and vested interests inherent in the case.

In popular culture 
This incident was the inspiration for manga short story—Stink Bomb—by Katsushiro Otomo. Stink Bomb featured as the second of three short stories in Memories, a 1995 Japanese animated science fiction anthology film for which he also served as executive producer. The movie was received positively, with Animage Magazine ranking Memories 68th in their list of 100 greatest anime productions in 2001. Specifically, the Stink Bomb story was praised for its humor and high quality visuals.

See also 

 List of unsolved deaths
 List of unusual deaths

References

1994 in California
Burials at Olivewood Memorial Park
Chemical accident
Conspiracy theories in the United States
Death conspiracy theories
Death in Riverside County, California
Deaths by person in California
Deaths from cancer in California
Deaths from cervical cancer
Unsolved deaths in the United States
Urban legends